McPeak is a surname. Notable people with the surname include:

Bill McPeak (1926–1991), American football player and coach
Holly McPeak (born 1969), American beach volleyball player
Mark McPeak (born 1968), Northern Irish bowls player
Merrill McPeak (born 1936), American politician and Chief of Staff of the United States Air Force
Sandy McPeak (1936–1997), American actor
Tony McPeak (footballer), Scottish footballer
Vivian McPeak (born 1958), American activist and musician